Danny Roy Moore (August 9, 1925 – c. 2020) was an American politician who was a conservative Democratic member of the Louisiana State Senate for one term, from 1964 until 1968.

Moore served in World War II aboard a B-24 bomber making raids over Germany. After the war, he received a degree in civil engineering from Louisiana State University, and worked as land surveyor. He was narrowly elected to the state senate in 1964, and focused his efforts there on the creation of Lake Claiborne.

Moore celebrated his 95th birthday in August 2020. He died sometime between then and April 2021, as noted in his son Daniel Judd Moore's obituary.

References

1925 births
2020 deaths
20th-century American engineers
20th-century American politicians
American surveyors
Louisiana State University alumni
Louisiana Tech University alumni
Democratic Party Louisiana state senators
People from Arcadia, Louisiana
People from Haynesville, Louisiana
People from Homer, Louisiana
United States Army Air Forces personnel of World War II
United States Army Air Forces soldiers
Year of death uncertain